G. Bailey Walsh (1905–1962) was a politician from the U.S. state of Tennessee. He served in the Navy, participated in the Nuremberg trials, served as a US District attorney, and was the head of the Republican Party of Tennessee, as well as the party's National Campaign Director.

Early life
Walsh was born in Trenton, Tennessee, later moving to Humboldt, Tennessee, where he attended Humboldt High School. He lived much of his life in Washington, D.C., and Memphis, Tennessee. In 1945 he married Dorothy McDaniel. He died April 8, 1962.

Career

World War II
During World War II, he served as a lieutenant commander in the US Navy on the aircraft carrier Essex. He served as an attorney during the Nuremberg trials. After returning from active duty, he was named attorney for the alien property section of the Department of Justice.

Legal and political
Although his father had been a US district attorney for the Democratic Wilson administration, Walsh was appointed an assistant US district attorney by Republican Herbert Hoover. He served from 1929-1932. Walsh was a Republican from Memphis, ran unsuccessfully for the Republican nomination for governor of Tennessee in 1938 and served as secretary of the Tennessee Republican Party in 1939. In 1940, he introduced the Republican nominee, Wendell Willkie at the Republican National Convention. In 1948, Walsh was the National Republican Campaign director. He was also an assistant attorney general for the state of Louisiana, for whom he worked on the Tidelands case, ultimately successfully arguing the case before the U.S. Supreme Court. Walsh is interred at Rose Hill Cemetery in Humboldt, Tennessee.

References

External links
Political Graveyard
Find a Grave

1905 births
1962 deaths
People from Memphis, Tennessee
Tennessee Republicans